Schreiber may refer to:

Companies
Schreiber Foods, a dairy company
Schreiber Furniture, a furniture manufacturer in the United Kingdom
T. Schreiber Studio, an acting studio in New York City, US

Places
Schreiber, Ontario, a township in Canada
Walther-Schreiber-Platz (Berlin U-Bahn), a German subway station

Other uses
Schreiber (surname)
Paul D. Schreiber High School in Port Washington, New York, United States
Polyura schreiber, a butterfly species
Schreiber Diesels, an ice hockey team in Ontario, Canada
Schreiber theory, a writer-centered approach to film criticism 
Schreibersite, a mineral
Schreiber's fringe-fingered lizard
Schreibers' long-fingered bat 
T. Schreiber Studio, an acting studio in New York City 

fr:Schreiber
he:שרייבר
pl:Schreiber
ru:Шрайбер